The Best of Donell Jones is a greatest hits album by R&B singer Donell Jones. It was released by LaFace Records on September 25, 2007 in the United States where it peaked at number 17 on the US Top R&B/Hip-Hop Albums.

Track listing

Charts

References

External links 
Sony Music Store

2007 greatest hits albums
Donell Jones albums
Contemporary R&B compilation albums
Albums produced by Tim & Bob
Albums produced by Jermaine Dupri